Nori Dalisay (born 1938) is a Filipina actress, who played mostly supporting roles. She made dozens of movies under her home studio Sampaguita Pictures

Dalisay made her first movie via Chavacano which reached the top billed by Dolphy.

Filmography

Chavacano - 1956
Rodora - 1956
Ismol Ba't Teribol - 1957
Hahabul-Habol - 1957
Mga Ligaw na Bulaklak - 1957
Baby Bubut - 1958

External links

1938 births
Living people
Filipino film actresses